Henry Averson Bradley (born September 4, 1953) is a former American football defensive tackle in the National Football League (NFL). He played college football at Alcorn State. He was drafted by the San Diego Chargers in the ninth round of the 1978 NFL Draft. Bradley would end up signing as a free agent and play for the Cleveland Browns.

References

1953 births
Living people
American football defensive tackles
Alcorn State Braves football players
Cleveland Browns players
People from St. Joseph, Louisiana